Mimema can refer to one of the following:

 Mimema (beetle), a genus of insects in the family Monotomidae
 Mimema (fungus), a genus of rust fungi in the family Uropyxidaceae